Konak Tunnel is a road tunnel in Konak district of in İzmir, Turkey. It was opened to traffic in 2015.

The tunnel is situated in Konak, İzmir connecting the Mustafa Kemal Coastal Boulevard in Konak with Yeşildere Street in Yeşildere neighborhood in the city's south. With the building of the tunnel, the traffic congestion in Konak area was significantly eased. Its construction began on 23 September 2011, and it was opened on 25 May 2015 by Prime minister Ahmet Davutoğlu. It has twin bores in  length carrying two lanes of traffic in each direction. The construction cost planned was  150 million.

References

Road tunnels in Turkey
Buildings and structures in İzmir
Tunnels completed in 2015
2015 establishments in Turkey
Konak District